Shannon Vallor is a philosopher of technology. She is the Baillie Gifford Chair in the Ethics of Data and Artificial Intelligence at the Edinburgh Futures Institute. She was at Santa Clara University in Santa Clara, California where she was the Regis and Dianne McKenna Professor of Philosophy at SCU.

Education and career
Vallor earned her PhD in philosophy from Boston College in 2001.

While obtaining her PhD at Boston College, Vallor was a teaching fellow from 1997–1999 in the department of philosophy. She was a lecturer at the University of San Francisco from 2001–2003. Vallor has been a professor in the philosophy department of Santa Clara University since 2003.

In addition to her academic career, Vallor also serves as a consulting AI Ethicist for Google's Cloud AI program. She has formerly served as president of the Society for Philosophy and Technology, is a member of the advisory board for Capita Social, and co-director and Secretary of the Board of the Foundation for Responsible Robotics, a not for profit non-government organization that advocates for the ethical design and production of robots. Vallor is also a scholar at the Markkula Center for Applied Ethics, where she and Princeton computer scientist Arvind Narayanan created a free, online module called "An Introduction to Software Engineering Ethics." She received the World Technology Award in Ethics in 2015, and in 2017 received both the Public Intellectual Award and President's Special Recognition Award from Santa Clara University.

Vallor has authored numerous articles on ethical issues in emerging technology, as well as a book, "Technology and the Virtues: A Philosophical Guide to a Future Worth Wanting".

In October 2019, it was announced that Vallor would be joining the faculty of the University of Edinburgh as the first Baillie Gifford Chair in the Ethics of Data and Artificial Intelligence at the Edinburgh Futures Institute (EFI).

Selected works

Books

Vallor, Shannon (2016). Technology and the Virtues: A Philosophical Guide to a Future Worth Wanting. Oxford University Press.

Journal articles
Vallor, Shannon (2010). "Social Networking Technology and the Virtues," Ethics and Information Technology 12:2, 157-170.
Vallor, Shannon (2011). "Knowing What to Wish For: Human Enhancement Technology, Dignity and Virtue," Techne 15:2, 82-100.
Vallor, Shannon (2011). "Carebots and Caregivers: Sustaining the Ethical Ideal of Care in the 21st Century," Philosophy and Technology 24:3, 251-268.
Vallor, Shannon (2012). "Flourishing on Facebook: Virtue Friendship and New Social Media," Ethics and Information Technology 14:3, 185-199.
Vallor, Shannon (2014). "Armed Robots and Military Virtue," in The Ethics of Information Warfare, eds. Floridi and Taddeo (Springer) 
Vallor, Shannon (2015). "Moral Deskilling and Upskilling in a New Machine Age: Reflections on the Ambiguous Future of Character," Philosophy and Technology. 28: (2015), 107-124.

Encyclopedia articles

Vallor, Shannon (2012; Revised 2015). "Social Networking and Ethics," Stanford Encyclopedia of Philosophy.

References 

Living people
Philosophers of technology
Artificial intelligence ethicists
American philosophers
Santa Clara University faculty
Boston College alumni
Date of birth missing (living people)
Place of birth missing (living people)
Year of birth missing (living people)